Ophraea is a genus of skeletonizing leaf beetles in the family Chrysomelidae. There are about eight described species in Ophraea. They are found in North America and the Neotropics.

Species
These eight species belong to the genus Ophraea:
 Ophraea elongata Jacoby, 1886
 Ophraea maculicollis Blake
 Ophraea melancholica Jacoby, 1886
 Ophraea metallica Jacoby, 1886
 Ophraea minor Jacoby, 1886
 Ophraea opaca Jacoby, 1892
 Ophraea rugosa Jacoby, 1886
 Ophraea subcostata Jacoby, 1886

References

Further reading

 
 
 
 

Galerucinae
Chrysomelidae genera
Articles created by Qbugbot
Taxa named by Martin Jacoby